Dana Brýdlová (born 16 October 1963) is a Czech gymnast. She competed in six events at the 1980 Summer Olympics.

References

1963 births
Living people
Czech female artistic gymnasts
Olympic gymnasts of Czechoslovakia
Gymnasts at the 1980 Summer Olympics
Sportspeople from Brno